Bull Fight is a coin-operated arcade game produced by Sega in 1984.

Description
The player assumes the role of a bullfighter attempting to defeat a bull. The bullfighter is controlled via a joystick and two buttons.

References

External links

1984 video games
Arcade video games
Sega video games
Multiplayer and single-player video games